Odontoglossum spectatissimum is a species of orchid ranging from northwestern Venezuela to Ecuador.

spectatissimum